Indogrammodes is a genus of moths of the family Crambidae. It contains only one species, Indogrammodes pectinicornalis, which is found in India.

References

Spilomelinae
Monotypic moth genera
Crambidae genera
Moths of Asia